Vidor may refer to:
 King Vidor, American film director
 Charles Vidor, Hungarian film director
 Giuseppe (Bepi) Vidor, Italian aircraft designer of Asso Aerei aircraft
 Vidor, a town and commune in Italy
 Vidor, Texas, a city in the USA
 Vidor Batteries, a subsidiary of Crompton Parkinson

See also
 Widor